The Pit Boss 250 is a NASCAR Xfinity Series race at Circuit of the Americas in Austin, Texas. The race was introduced in 2021 and is one of seven road course dates on the Xfinity Series schedule.

Pit Boss Grills holds the naming rights to the race. The Pit Boss 250, along with the NASCAR Craftsman Truck Series' XPEL 225, is a support event to the NASCAR Cup Series' Texas Grand Prix.

Past winners

Manufacturer wins

References

External links
 

2021 establishments in Texas
Circuit of the Americas
NASCAR races at Circuit of the Americas
NASCAR Xfinity Series races
Annual sporting events in the United States